The Sierre-Zinal race is an annual mountain running race that takes place in the Swiss canton of Valais each August. It is also known as the race of five 4000ers ("La course des cinq 4000"), as five peaks over four thousand meters are visible along its path: Weisshorn (4506 m), Zinalrothorn (4221 m), Obergabelhorn (4073 m), Matterhorn (4478 m), and Dent Blanche (4357 m).

Results

Men

Women

References

External links

Athletics competitions in Switzerland
Skyrunning competitions
Skyrunner World Series
Summer events in Switzerland
Golden Trail Series
Sport in Valais